Sir John Talbot (7 June 1630 – 13 March 1714) was an English politician, soldier, and landowner, who was Member of Parliament for various seats between 1660 and 1685. He held rank in a number of regiments, although he does not appear to have seen active service. 

He took part in several duels, as both principal and second, including one in 1667 between George Villiers, 2nd Duke of Buckingham and his relative, Francis Talbot, 11th Earl of Shrewsbury, which ended in the latter's death.

Like most of his family, he was a Stuart loyalist, and lost his positions following the November 1688 Glorious Revolution. He refused to swear allegiance to the new regime of Mary II and William III, but did not take part in any Jacobite plots.

He died in March 1714; his property was left to his grandson, John Ivory-Talbot (1691–1772).

Biography 

John Talbot was born on 7 June 1630, the eldest surviving son of Colonel Sharington Talbot (1599–1677), and Jane Lyttelton. He had a sister, Elizabeth (died 1709).

Related to the Earls of Shrewsbury, the Talbots' main estates were in Salwarpe, Worcestershire. They acquired Lacock Abbey, Wiltshire through his great-grandmother, Olive, who died at the age of 97 in 1646. Like John himself, both his uncle Sir Gilbert and father lived into their 80s, as did many other close relatives.

In 1653, he married Elizabeth Keyt, who died in childbirth in 1656, and was buried with her infant son in Stow-on-the-Wold. He married again in 1660, this time to Barbara Slingsby (1633 –1703), daughter of Sir Henry Slingsby, executed in 1658 for plotting against the Protectorate. They had three daughters who lived to adulthood; Anne (1665–1720), Barbara (1671–1763), and Gilberta (1675–1746). His estates were inherited by his grandson John Ivory-Talbot (1691–1772), son of Anne and her husband Sir John Ivory.

Career
In the First English Civil War, his father played a prominent role in raising Wiltshire for Charles I, and garrisoned Lacock Abbey until its capture in September 1645. He was imprisoned for a year, and eventually released after paying a fine of £2,000; John's uncle, Sir Gilbert, was arrested in 1650 on suspicion of conspiring to restore Charles II, and went into exile. 

In August 1659, Talbot was briefly arrested for alleged complicity in Booth's Rising, a Royalist rebellion easily crushed by John Lambert. In the lead up to the 1660 Restoration, he was elected for Worcestershire in the Convention Parliament, and knighted by Charles II at Whitehall on 6 June 1660. He was made captain in a company of the Foot Guards in February 1661. 

In April, he was elected to the Cavalier Parliament as MP for Knaresborough, a constituency controlled by the Slingsby family. He played an active role in co-ordinating votes in Parliament, and like his uncle, was closely associated with the Duke of Ormond.  

English politics was riven by factionalism, which combined with a passion for duelling often resulted in violence. Talbot took part in two famous duels involving his relatives, the first in 1666 between Thomas Belasyse and Thomas Osborne, later Lord Danby, then a supporter of the Duke of Buckingham. In January 1668, he acted for Francis Talbot, 11th Earl of Shrewsbury in a duel with Buckingham, in which the Earl was fatally wounded. At the time, it was common for seconds to participate; Talbot was also injured, one of Buckingham's supporters killed.

When the Third Anglo-Dutch War began in March 1672, Talbot was appointed lieutenant-colonel of the Barbados Dragoons, which was disbanded after the Treaty of Westminster in February 1674. England re-entered the Franco-Dutch War in March 1678 after signing a defensive alliance with the Dutch Republic; Talbot was appointed colonel of a Regiment of Dragoons, but the war ended before it saw service.

The 1679 Parliament was dominated by the Exclusion Crisis, over whether the Catholic James could succeed his brother as king. Talbot was MP for Chippenham; in Lord Shaftesbury's analysis of MPs, he is marked as opposing exclusion, or 'Vile'. In addition to his military offices, he is listed as receiving '£800 per year from the Wiltshire Excise, and the reversion of the Jewel Office', then held by Sir Gilbert.  

Described by the French ambassador as 'very Protestant, and very Royalist', he summarised the dilemma of many, who supported James' right to the throne, but opposed concessions to Catholicism in general. In 1681, Talbot was elected for Ludgershall; the return was disputed, Parliament dissolved within a week, and he never took his seat.  

James succeeded as monarch in February 1685, and in March, Talbot was elected for Devizes in the Loyal Parliament, so-called for the large majority who backed his right to the throne.  When the Monmouth rebellion began in June, he raised a troop of horse, which was disbanded after the revolt collapsed. However, James used the opportunity to expand the Royal Army, and Talbot became lieutenant-colonel of Lord Peterborough's dragoons. 

In a measure of how seriously James misjudged the situation, Parliament refused to pass his religious policies, which were seen as undermining the Church of England. It was suspended in November 1685, and not held again during his reign. At the same time, resistance within the army to the appointment of Catholic officers resulted in the resignation of many senior officers. They included Lord Lumley, whom Talbot replaced as colonel of the Queen Dowager's dragoons in January 1687. 

By 1688, James had alienated much of his support base, except for loyalists like Talbot, and his uncle, Sir Gilbert. In the November 1688 Glorious Revolution, William of Orange landed in Torbay. The majority of the Royal Army defected, Talbot being one of the few to return his commission to James in person, on 20 December 1688.

This ended his military career; in 1690, he refused to swear allegiance to Mary II and William III, which meant he was ineligible for any public offices. Many High Church Tories like Talbot did so because they felt bound by their original oath, not necessarily because they were Jacobites; he was briefly held during the Jacobite invasion scare of 1692, and remained sympathetic, but does not appear to have been an active participant.

He died on 13 March 1714, leaving his estates to his grandson, James Ivory Talbot. He was buried in St Cyriac's Church, Lacock; his tomb was removed during 19th century renovation works, but parts of it were re-used for the 1914–1918 village war memorial.

Notes

References

Sources
 
 
 
 
 
 
 
 
 
 
 
 
 
 

1630 births
1714 deaths
John
2nd Dragoon Guards (Queen's Bays) officers
Carabiniers (6th Dragoon Guards) officers
English generals
English MPs 1660
English MPs 1661–1679
English MPs 1679
English MPs 1685–1687
Members of the Parliament of England for Worcestershire
Members of the Parliament of England (pre-1707) for Wiltshire
Grenadier Guards officers
English duellists